The Greek Women's Volleyball Super Cup is a volleyball club competition that takes place in Greece since 2012. It is an annual match contested between the Champion of Greek Volleyleague and the Cup's Winner. So far, one only match has taken place. The match held in 2012, between AEK Athens (Winner of the 2012 Championship) and Olympiacos (Winner of the 2012 Cup). The match took place in Elassona gymnasium and AEK was the winner. MVP was Sonia Borovincek, player of AEK. The next two years, the competition wasn't held because Olympiacos won the Double.

The matches

Performance by club

References

Volleyball in Greece